Gooseberry Creek flows into Schoharie Creek by Tannersville, New York .

References

Rivers of New York (state)
Rivers of Greene County, New York